Kaare Bache (28 April 1888 – 13 March 1978) was a Norwegian triple jumper. He represented Kristiania IF and Oslo IL.
 
At the 1920 Summer Olympics he finished ninth in the triple jump final with a jump of 13.64 metres. He became Norwegian champion in triple jump in 1920 and 1925  and in decathlon in 1921.

His personal best jump was 14.63 metres, achieved in July 1920 in Kristiania.

Bache was a reserve officer in the Norwegian Army.

References

1888 births
1978 deaths
Norwegian male triple jumpers
Athletes (track and field) at the 1920 Summer Olympics
Olympic athletes of Norway
Norwegian Army personnel